Acronicta spinigera, the nondescript dagger moth, is a species of moth of the family Noctuidae. It is found in southeastern Canada (Quebec and Ontario) and the eastern United States.

The wingspan is about 40 mm.  Adults are in flight from May to July in the northern part of the range and from April to September in the southern part.

External links
Images

Acronicta
Moths of North America
Moths described in 1852